The following media outlets serve Kansas City, Missouri and the surrounding Kansas City metropolitan area.

Print

Magazines
Camp Magazine, local LGBT news, monthly
Ingram's Magazine, local business news, monthly
Our Health Matters, health and wellness, bi-monthly
Spaces Kansas City, lifestyle and entertainment, bi-monthly

Newspapers
The Kansas City Star is the city's primary newspaper, published daily.

Other papers published in the city include:
The Call, local African-American news, weekly
Kansas City Business Journal, business news, weekly
The Kansas City Globe, local African-American news, weekly
Kansas City Hispanic News, local Hispanic news, weekly
The Metro Voice Christian Newspaper, local news, monthly/daily digital
National Catholic Reporter, Roman Catholic news, bi-weekly
Northeast News, Northeast Kansas City neighborhood news, weekly
The Pitch, alternative newspaper, weekly
University News, University of Missouri–Kansas City student newspaper, weekly

Television
Kansas City is the second largest television media market in the state of Missouri after St. Louis, and, as ranked by population by Arbitron, the 31st largest market in the United States.

The following is a list of television stations that broadcast from and/or are licensed to Kansas City, Missouri.

According to Arbitron, the following counties are in Kansas City's DMA:
Kansas – Anderson, Atchison, Douglas, Franklin, Johnson, Leavenworth, Linn, Miami, Wyandotte
Missouri – Bates, Caldwell, Carroll, Cass, Clay, Clinton, Daviess, Gentry, Grundy, Harrison, Henry, Jackson, Johnson, Lafayette, Linn, Livingston, Mercer, Nodaway, Pettis, Platte, Ray, Saline, Worth

Much of the Kansas City area is served by both Spectrum and Google Fiber, with some Kansas and Missouri suburbs served by Comcast.  Sections of South Kansas City and some Kansas suburbs are also served by Surewest.  Additionally, parts of western Wyandotte County are served by Sunflower Broadband-based out of Lawrence, Kansas.

Local cable-only channels include Metro Sports, operated by Time Warner.

Radio
Kansas City is the 32nd largest radio market (as determined by Arbitron).  Several radio stations cover the Kansas City area, though none provide classical music, including:

FM radio

1 KCKC switches to an all-holiday format during the months of November and December.

AM radio

Sports coverage
Related Article: Kansas City Sports

Time Warner Cable subscribers receive local sports programming from Metro Sports (Channel 1310 HD, 30 SD), which includes a nightly sportscast, Chiefs, Royals, college, and high school talk shows, postgame coverage of Chiefs games, and high school and college game coverage.

Notable personalities who worked in the market
Walt Bodine, WHB, KCMO-AM, WDAF, KCUR
Walter Cronkite, KCMO-AM
Harris Faulkner, WDAF-TV
Rush Limbaugh, KMBZ, KFIX (now KCXL), and KUDL
Mancow Muller, KBEQ, now syndicated through Talk Radio Network

References

External links
Kansas City Radio and TV - Detailed histories of radio and television frequencies in Kansas City, St. Joseph, Lawrence, and Topeka
 -  -  Broadcast Authorizations in Topeka & KC to Heartland Broadcasting, LLC in Topeka, KS

Kansas

Mass media in Missouri